Yuanqu County is a county in Yuncheng City, in the south of Shanxi province, China, bordering Henan province to the southeast and south. It is the easternmost county-level division of Yuncheng.

Climate

References

www.xzqh.org 

County-level divisions of Shanxi